Johann of Isenberg-Limburg of Limburg (born before 1246, died before 1277), son of Dietrich I of Isenberg. He married Agnes von Wildenberg; they had three children:

 Dietrich II lord of Limburg-Styrum (born before 1277, died 22 march 1328) 
 Friedrich, a canon in Cologne (born before 1277, died 1321);;
 Mechtild, (born before 1277, died 1306) married 1286 Egbert von Almelo.

Literature
 Hoederath, H.T. Der Fall des Hauses Isenberg 1225/1226 . In rechtsgeschichterlicher und soziologischer Schau, 1954 Zeitschrift der Savigny stiftung fur Rechtsgeschichte. Kanonistische Abteilung
 Aders,G. Die Grafen (von Limburg zu Hohenlimburg) und die Herrn von Limburg zu Styrum aus dem Haus Berg-Altena-Isenberg. Zeitschift 'Der Marker" 1956 blad 7.
 Berg, A. Lineage counts of Limburg Hohenlimburg and Linage Lords of Limburg-Styrum. Archive fur Sippenforschung Heft 14. Jahrgang 30. Mai 1964.
 Korteweg, K.N. Dietrich I Graf von Limburg Hohenlimburg. His two descendant lines Lords of Limburg Styrum and counts of Limburg Hohenlimburg. De Nederlandse Leeuw Jaargang LXXXI no.8. August 1964. Pages 266-276.

References

Counts of Germany
House of Berg
House of Limburg-Stirum
13th-century births
13th-century deaths
Year of birth unknown
Year of death unknown